Komine may refer to:

Komine Castle in Fukushima, Japan
Kominé, Mali, a village and the seat of the commune of Farakou Massa in the Cercle of Ségou in the Ségou Region of southern-central Mali
Komine, Montenegro, a village in Pljevlja Municipality in northern Montenegro
Shane Komine (born 1980), an American former Major League Baseball player
Takayuki Komine (born 1974), a former Japanese football player
Acer micranthum, known in Japan as the "Komine maple", a species of Japanese maple